The Inn of Chicago, originally known as the Hotel St. Clair, was built in 1927 by Oman & Lihienthal, and is located at 162 East Ohio Street in the Streeterville neighborhood of Chicago. The hotel is currently part of the Choice Hotels International hotel chain, after a history involving many exchanges between management companies.

Location
The . Inn of Chicago Magnificent Mile Hotel is located on the northwest corner of Ohio Street and St. Clair, one block east of the Magnificent Mile shopping district in downtown Chicago, Illinois.

History
The structure was built as the Hotel St. Clair in 1927 by Oman & Lihienthal and decorated by Geo. P. Davidson. Half of the 21-story building was designated one-bedroom residences to Chicago's most prominent figures of the 1920s.  The remainder was hotel rooms and was frequented by well-known guests such as Judy Garland, Gypsy Rose Lee, Roy Rogers, Dean Martin, Bob Hope, Jerry Lewis and Irv Kupcinet

The top floor, known as the Skyline Terrace Penthouse housed the Chicago Press Club from 1960 to 1978. The Chicago Press Club occupied this 22nd-floor space longer than any location in its history and during its residency it hosted to some of Chicago’s most famous newscasters. In 1980, Hotel St. Clair was renamed The Inn of Chicago after a $13 million renovation. Shell Hospitality Group reopened the hotel in February 1982 as part of the Best Western chain. In November 2006, the Chartres Lodging Group umbrella of hotels purchased the Inn of Chicago from Best Western for $40 million.

After the sale, the hotel underwent major renovations including a new lobby, new guest rooms, bathrooms, and a refurbished lobby and bar. The primary historic façade and trademark "Inn of Chicago" neon sign were restored. The 22-story hotel is now equipped with a fitness center, business center, innbar, and a street-level Lavazza café with outdoor seating area. The latest renovation gave the rooms a boutique hotel feel reminiscent of the 1920s.

Ownership/Management
IOC Hotel, LLC, a joint venture between The Chartres Lodging Group of San Francisco and Longwing Real Estate Ventures, LLC, a member of the Dubai Investment Group purchased the Inn of Chicago. Kokua Hospitality LLC, a wholly owned subsidiary of The Chartres Lodging Group, LLC has managed the Inn of Chicago since its re-opening in 2006.  The venture also operates The Doubletree Hotel Chicago Magnificent Mile, the Allerton Hotel in Chicago and the Aloft Washington National Harbor.  In 2009, the Inn of Chicago became part of the Maryland-based Choice Hotels International and Ascend Collection chain of hotels.

External links
Official site

References

Hotel buildings completed in 1927
History of Chicago
Hotels in Chicago